Stadttheater Herford  is a theatre in Herford, North Rhine-Westphalia, Germany. It is a venue without an ensemble of its own.

Theatres in North Rhine-Westphalia